Budapest's Palotanegyed (Palace District) forms an inner part of Pest, the eastern half of Budapest.  Known until the communist period as the ‘Magnates’ Quarter’, it consists of the western part of the city's Eighth District, or Józsefváros (Joseph Town), which was named on 7 November 1777 after Joseph II, Holy Roman Emperor and Archduke of Austria (1741-1790), who reigned 1765-1790 (1780-1790 as King of Hungary). (Vienna's Eighth District, the Josefstadt, was also named after him, but long after his reign, in 1850).  Józsefváros developed immediately east of the medieval walls of Pest and was originally called Lerchenfeld (‘Lark Field’) or the Alsó-Külváros (‘Lower Suburb’). The Palotanegyed's borders are the Múzeum körút to the west, Rákóczi út to the north, the József körút to the east and Üllői út to the south. There is an extensive photo archive of the Palace District at the Fortepan website.

Pre-1945 History 

   

The two-metre great flood of 1838 caused the collapse of 900 buildings in the Józsefváros, with only 250 surviving. The few buildings in the Palotanegyed which survive from before 1838 include the Szent Rókus-kápolna (Chapel of St Roch - the patron saint of plague sufferers), built in 1711 in the hope of warding off the plague then devastating Pest, on the site of an early Christian, possibly 4th century, chapel.  The oldest known building in the Palace District, it was rebuilt in 1945 after being destroyed in World War II - and then was damaged badly again in 1956.  The Szent Rókus Kórház (St Roch Hospital) next door - was opened in 1796, but in its current incarnation offers few clues to its antiquity.

The major impetus for the area's development after the great flood was the construction at its western end of the magnificent neo-classical Hungarian National Museum between 1837 and 1847, designed by the Viennese-born architect Mihály Pollack, after whom the square behind the museum is named.  Meetings of the upper house of the Hungarian parliament, established as part of the compromise which founded the dual monarchy of Austria-Hungary in 1867, were held in the National Museum until the opening of the new Hungarian parliament building in 1904.

The rest of Hungary's original parliament was established next door to the museum at Főherceg Sándor utca 8 (Archduke Alexander Street), named in honour of Hungary's Habsburg Palatine, or Viceroy, during the years 1790–95, Archduke Alexander Leopold of Austria, in 1840. (In 1946 it was renamed Bródy Sándor utca - see below). The building, completed in 1866, was designed by one of 19th century Budapest's great architects, Miklós Ybl, who also designed the Opera House and the Basilica, as well as five of the Palotanegyed's palaces (Festetics, Pálffy, Károlyi (on Pollack Mihály tér), Bókay and Odescalchi/Degenfeld-Schomburg).  Today the old parliament building houses the Italian Cultural Institute.

Until the outbreak of the First World War, these two buildings provided the impetus to members of the dual monarchy's aristocratic and mercantile elite - many of whom were members of parliament - building around 40 city palaces or mansions in the same area.  The Károlyi family alone built four palaces in the district, Count János Zichy and his family three, while the Bánffy and Wenckheim families each built two.  The district's palaces were mostly constructed in the streets surrounding the Museum (today's Bródy Sándor utca, Pollack Mihály tér, Múzeum utca, Reviczky utca, Ötpacsirta utca and Trefort utca.)

A number were also built further east, including on today's Lőrinc pap tér, Gyulai Pál utca, Horánszky utca and Szentkirályi utca.  The other residential buildings constructed in the Palace District around the same time were designed mainly for middle or upper-middle class occupants. The term 'palota' ('palace') is used more elastically in Hungary (and in much of Continental Europe) than in the English-speaking world. In the Palotanegyed it refers to everything from genuine palaces (such as the Wenckeim Palace, now Szabó Ervin Library) for aristocratic families, to buildings with generously proportioned apartments for the wealthy upper-middle classes (such as the Emich Palace on Horánszky utca).

The Palace District is also notable for one of Budapest's two surviving buildings designed by the famous Viennese architects Fellner & Helmer, the István Károlyi or Károlyi-Csekonics palace at Múzeum utca 17. (The other is the Vígszínház on the Szent István körút).

One of the great classical architects of Pest, József Hild, designed one of the earlier buildings in the district, the 1842 Virágfüzéres ház (‘Garland House’) at Baross utca 40. Long in an advanced state of dilapidation, in March 2021 its street exterior at least was in the process of being sympathetically restored.

Most of the Palotanegyed's architecture echoes that of the Viennese Franz-Joseph era from the 1840s until World War One. However, there are also a number of buildings in the Hungarian Secession style, championed most famously by Ödön Lechner, notably the striking Gutenberg Otthon, designed by two of his most prominent disciples, the Nagyvárád-born brothers József and László Vágó and constructed in 1905-6 (there are restoration/renovation plans for the building) There are several other buildings in the Hungarian Secession style on Vas utca, Baross utca and Krúdy utca. Lechner's Jewish student Béla Lajta's designed the 1912 Count Széchenyi School of Trade on Vas utca, a striking contrast to most of the Palace District's architecture, fusing modernism, art deco and folk motifs. Its rich interior decoration, remarkably, survived World War II.

A well-known Hungarian-Jewish architectural team also designed Hungary's first department store, the Corvin Áruház, on Blaha Lujza tér. The architect was Zoltán Reiss, who designed many buildings in Budapest and elsewhere in Hungary during the first decades of the twentieth century, and who also served as an officer in the Austro-Hungarian army in the First World War. Construction of the classicist building began in 1915, with the department store finally opening in 1926 (five years later it incorporated Hungary's first escalator). It was owned by M.J. Emden and Sons, Hamburg. The external sculptural reliefs were the work of the famous Hungarian-Jewish sculptor Ödön Beck, who vanished on 31 January 1945 during the Siege of Budapest.  
 
One of the lesser-known architects who designed buildings in the Palotanegyed's pre-World War One boom period was another Jewish architect, Adolf Greiner (born Losoncz, now Slovakia, 1847, died Budapest 1931). He designed the Újpest synagogue, built 1885–86, and a number of inner Pest apartment buildings in the 1890s, including the four-storey building at Horánszky utca 27, built in 1892.

The Palace District contains important educational and cultural institutions.  Between the Muzéum körút and Puskin utca is the Humanities Faculty of Budapest's Eötvös Loránd University, built 1880-3 by Imre Steindl, also the architect of the Parliament building. The central administration and many of the departments of the city's Semmelweis University (of medicine) occupy the block between Üllöi út, Baross utca, Maria utca and Szentkírályi utca.  They had appeared on maps by 1896 and are of a similar style to the nearby Eötvös Loránd University buildings. In addition, the Semmelweis University's Faculty of Health Sciences and the Hungarian Society of Therapists are housed in the former sanatorium and medicinal baths at Vas utca 17 (see photo). The Pázmány Péter Catholic University occupies two buildings on Szentkírály utca, while the German-language Andrássy University is housed in the Festetics Palace. The Arts and Humanities Faculty of the Károli Gáspár University of the Reformed Church of Hungary is at Revitczky utca 4 and plans to expand ts presence in the Palotanegyed, into the former Károlyi palaces between Reviczky utca and Muzéum utca once their current redevelopment has been completed.

Schools in the district include the Széchenyi School of Trade on Vas utca, the Eötvös Loránd University Trefort Ágoston teacher-practicing High School on Trefort utca, and three on Horánszky utca - the Benda Kálmán Arts and Social Sciences College (part of the Károli Gáspár University); the Vörösmarty Mihály Gimnázium the Saint Ignatius Jesuit College.

The main church in the district is the mainly neo-Romanesque Jézus Szíve templom (Church of the Sacred Heart), on Lörincz Pap tér, which was built 1880–1890 to the designs of József Kauser. Kauser also completed the spectacular interior of the Basilica after Miklós Ybl died in 1891 and designed the south-eastern quarter of the Kódály körönd, the magnificent quartet of residential palaces on Andrássy út between Oktogon and Heroes’ Square. The area around the Jézus Szíve templom has long been known as the ‘little Vatican’ for its numerous institutions connected with the Catholic Church. These include the Jézus Szíve Jezsuita lélkeszség (the Society of Jesus Convent) at Maria utca 25, the Kollégium Teréziánum of the Miasszonyunkról Nevezett Kalocsai Iskolanövérek Társulata (Terezianum College (student dormitory) of the Society of Our Lady Sisters of Kalocsa School at Maria utca 20 and several in Horánszky utca: the Saint Ignatius Jesuit College mentioned above (18); the Divine Saviour's Sisters Saint Anna College (Isteni Megváltóról Nevezett Nővérek Szent Anna Collégiuma)(17); the 1912 Párbeszédháza, the House of Dialogue, the Jesuits' spiritual and cultural centre in Budapest(20) (handed after the communist regime's dissolution of the Jesuit order to the Karl Marx University; ‘the ruined building was returned to the Jesuit order and the order had the building renovated by its hundredth anniversary’); and the Jézus Szíve társasága egyetemi szakkkolegiumá (during World War II the Jézus Szive Népleanyok Társasága (Sacred Heart Society of Folkgirls) was at this address) (14).

These institutions played a heroic role in helping persecuted Jews after the German occupation of Hungary in March 1944. The sisters of the Saint Anna College gave refuge to Jewish girls while the Sacred Heart Society of Folkgirls issued protective documents. The convent in Maria utca hid Jewish men, while the House of Dialogue, according to the plaque outside, ‘hid almost forty deserters and 120 Jews away in the basement and then helped them escape abroad.’

The 1877 Rabbinical Seminary and Budapest University of Jewish Studies on Gutenberg tér (Országos Rabbiképző - Zsidó Egyetem and Alapítvány a Zsidó Egyetemért) is the world's oldest institution where rabbis graduate. It also contains a synagogue. Its construction was financed by the Emperor and King Franz Joseph, and was originally named after him. (He visited it a month after its opening in November 1877). After the German occupation of Hungary in March 1944, the rabbinical institute was seized by the SS and turned into a prison. Adolf Eichmann used it as a base to organise the deportation of Hungarian Jews, mainly to Auschwitz.

According to the Wikipedia article on the institute, an important part of its library was seized by the Nazis. ‘3000 books were dispatched to Prague, where Eichmann planned the construction of a "Museum of an extinct race" in the former Jewish quarter. Only in the 1980s were the books discovered in the cellar of the Jewish Museum of Prague and brought back to Budapest in 1989. ‘The library remains a source of pride for the university. It is considered one of the most important collections of Jewish theological literature outside Israel.’ During the communist period, the rabbinical seminary in Budapest, uniquely in Eastern Europe, continued to operate, attracting students from across the region, including the Soviet Union.

In addition to the main cultural institutions in the Palace District - the National Museum and the Szabó Ervin Library - the Uránia Cinema, at Rákóczy út 21, is also noteworthy. Designed by Henrik Schmahl in a hybrid Venetian Gothic-Moorish style, it opened in the mid-1890s initially as a cabaret theatre. Restored in 2002 to its original glory, four years later the Uránia was awarded the European Union's heritage protection prize, Europa Nostra, for outstanding restoration.

Soviet Occupation and Communism 

 Still bullet-marked buildings show that the Palace District, like the rest of Budapest, was left scarred by the fighting at the end of the Second World War. The damage was particularly bad around the Nagykörút and Kálvin tér. But while buildings on the former were reconstructed more or less to their original state, on Kálvin tér many of the fine 19th century buildings on both sides of the square were demolished. More damage in both parts of the Palace District was inflicted during the 1956 uprising and the subsequent Soviet attack.

The communist regime neglected the district's buildings and committed some great acts of vandalism, especially the demolition in 1965 of the city's National Theatre, until 1908 the Népszínház (People's Theatre - or Volkstheater) on Blaha Lujza tér. This building, much loved by Budapesters, had been constructed in 1875 to the designs of Fellner & Helmer.  The loss of the National Theatre still seems to leave a gap on Blaha Lujza tér.  A street on the eastern side of the József körút which led to the Népszínház is still called Népszínház utca. In 1948 the regime also demolished the National Stables behind the Museum. In 1952, it used part of the area to construct a concrete bunker designed to enable the regime to continue broadcasting in case of emergency including nuclear attack.  The interior ministry also used it for conducting wiretaps. In 1969 this was incorporated into a larger Hungarian Radio office block equally unsympathetic to its grand surroundings.

As the post-war communist regime consolidated its grip, the names of a number of streets and institutions in the Palotanegyed were changed. In 1946 Főherceg Sándor utca (Archduke Alexander Street) was renamed Bródy Sándor utca.Sándor Bródy (writer) (1863-1924) was a Jewish-born novelist, dramatist, and short-story writer who was 'among the first in Hungarian literature to focus attention on the urban proletariat, and the first to introduce the coarse and pungent vernacular of the big city into literary works'.  In the same year the metropolitan library in the former Wenckheim Palace was named the Szabó Ervin Library in honour of Ervin Szabó, a revolutionary socialist who translated the works of Marx and Engels into Hungarian and who in 1911 had been appointed the library's director. In 1949, Eszterházy utca and Ötpacsirta utca were renamed Puskin utca.  Two years later, in 1948, the section of Baross utca in front of the library was renamed Szabó Ervin tér Surprisingly, the communist regime did not rename the József körút (Joseph ringroad), named after the Archduke of Austria and Holy Roman Emperor Joseph II, as it did the Teréz and Erzsébet stretches of the ringroad, also named after Habsburg monarchs. In 1950, Horánszky utca, named after Dual Monarchy-era Hungarian member of parliament and trade minister Nándor Horánszky, was renamed Makarenko utca, in honour of Soviet educational theorist Anton Makarenko. In 1962, Rökk Szillárd utca, named after a wealthy 19th century philanthropist, was renamed Somogyi Béla after a leftist journalist murdered by White forces in 1920.

Of the Palotanegyed's eleven or so cafés which existed during Budapest's pre-war heyday, all except one vanished. The one survival, the Muzéum, though it calls itself a café-restaurant is today only a restaurant.

Since 1989 

Despite the occasional acts of disdain and vandalism shown by the communist regime towards Budapest's historical fabric, the vast majority of the Palotanegyed's pre-World War II buildings survived war, revolution, Soviet occupation and the socialist decades.  At the same time, by the early post-communist period, the Józsefváros had acquired a reputation amongst Hungarians as the poorest and most crime-ridden of the Pest districts.  This reputation reflected the dilapidation and poverty especially of the outer part of the district (i.e. east of the Józsefkörút) and the proportionately high population of typically poor gypsies in that area.  This reputation coloured perceptions of the whole of Józsefváros, including, probably unfairly, the Palotanegyed. It was ironic given that historically the area had been one of the wealthiest parts of the city.

One of the early decisions of the post-1989 democratic authorities was to restore some pre-communist street names.  Horánszky utca and Ötpacsirta utca reappeared as did Rökk Szillárd, although, oddly, only at its southern end. Bródy Sándor utca, Puskin utca, Somogyi Béla (at its northern end) and Szabó Ervin tér remained unchanged. The 1930 statue of Count Nandor Zichy in front of what was his palace on Lörinc Pap tér returned.

Since the mid-1990s, the Palotanegyed's fortunes have steadily recovered.  Many of the district's palaces have been restored, and slowly but surely other buildings are following suit.  Local and international investors have seen that the area combines charm and inner-city convenience.  And the Józsefváros local government has made much progress rebuilding the district's streets to make pedestrian-only areas, widen footpaths, rationalise parking, plant more trees and generally smarten the area up.  As of November 2022, areas completed include Reviczky utca, Ötpacsirta utca, Mikszáth Kálmán tér, the area between the Szabó Ervin library and Calvin tér, Lőrinc pap tér, Maria utca, Kőfaragó utca, Gyulai Pál utca, Horánszky utca, much of Krúdy utca, Gutenberg tér, Bródy Sándor utca between the Múzeum körút and Horánszky utca, Rökk Szillárd utca and Somogyi Béla utca. The mainly pedestrian area along Krúdy utca between Mikszáth Kálmán tér and Lőrinc pap tér thrives with restaurants and cafes in a way that wouldn't have been imagined before the 1989 changes.

In October 2022 the Józsefváros council announced that two further stretches of street renovation would be completed in the first half of 2023, Krúdy utca between Lörincz pap tér and the Nagykörút and Mária utca between Lörincz pap tér and Baross utca. 

In May 2018 the Józsefváros council announced that funds had been also been allocated for reconstruction of sections of Szentkirályi utca and that Puskin utca, Trefort utca and Somogyi Béla utca would also be renovated. In April 2019 the council reported that the street reconstruction project would be undertaken as part of the third phase of the Europe Inner Cities programme and would comprise, in addition to work now completed on Bródy Sándor utca and Rökk Szilárd utca, Szentkirályi utca between Bródy Sándor utca and Mikszáth Kálmán tér. Trefort utca and Pollack Mihály tér 'could also be renovated in the future'.

In July 2016 the media reported that the Hungarian National Museum's gardens would get a facelift, that three buildings belonging to Hungarian Radio - the former Károlyi and Eszterházy palaces on Pollack Mihály tér and the Magyar Rádio palace at Bródy Sándor utca 5-7 - would be renovated and used by the National Museum; that the two communist-era Hungarian Radio buildings on Pollack Mihály tér would be demolished; and that the green spaces around the original palaces would be restored. The National Museum garden restoration project was completed in April 2019.

But there was a change of plan and on 3 March 2020 the national government proposed legislation transferring ownership of the Hungarian Radio buildings in the Palotanegyed which were given to the National Museum in 2016, with the addition of Szentkírályi utca 25/A, 25/B and 27, to the Pázmány Péter Catholic University. The Parliament approved the plan on 31 March. It was reported in June 2019 that the Pázmány Péter Catholic University had also acquired the Kéményseprő ház (the ‘Chimney Sweep House’), the classicist building at Bródy Sándor utca 15 built 1851-5 and designed by Károly Hild, brother of the more famous Budapest architect József Hild, which would house the university's central offices. In November 2021 the winning design for the new campus was announced. The plan would involve the demolition of the two communist-era former Hungarian Radio buildings on Pollack Mihály tér and the project would be completed by 2026.

In April 2018 it was announced that Blaha Lujza tér would undergo a major renovation with green spaces replacing the current car-park area.  At the same time, the 1926 Corvin Áruház (department store) would get a facelift with its communist-era aluminium layer removed and the original façade restored. Works were originally scheduled to be completed by the end of 2019, but the new Józsefváros council, elected in the October 2019 local elections, delayed the work while it reviewed the plans. Józsefváros deputy mayor Dániel Rádai was quoted in July 2020 saying that reconstruction of the square would start in the spring of 2021, at the same that the restoration of the facade of the Corvin Áruház, which was expected to take eighteen months. He also foreshadowed the reconstruction of so far unreconstructed streets in the Palace District, firstly Szentkirályi utca. In December 2020 it was reported that the work would begin in 2021 and be completed by the autumn of 2022.

More promising news for the district came with Budapest mayor Karácsony's announcement in early 2021 of his development plans for the city over the next seven years.  These include long-overdue improvements to Rákóczi út and Üllöi út, both bordering one side in the Palace District.  Despite being lined with magnificent buildings, both have become unlovely major roads, difficult for pedestrians to cross and with long stretches treeless.  While the plan is currently short on detail, the stated aim will be to reduce road traffic, to give preference to public transport, to provide wider pedestrian areas and better provision for cycling and to plant more trees.

It was announced in July 2021 that the long empty and neglected turn of the 20th century former Hungarian Association of Civil Servants building at Puskin utca 4 would be restored and redeveloped.

The Palotanegyed Palaces

External links

References

Józsefváros
Neighbourhoods of Budapest
Urban planning